Nicholas James Potts (born 17 July 2002) is an English cricketer who plays for Derbyshire.

In November 2020, at the age of eighteen, Potts signed a rookie contract with Derbyshire, and had previously played for the Young Lions. In August 2021, Potts signed a three-year deal with Derbyshire, after coming through the club's academy system. Potts had been hampered by an ankle injury, which had only allowed him to play in four matches for Derbyshire's second XI team in 2021. Derbyshire's head of cricket, Dave Houghton said that Potts is a "talent for the future".

In April 2022, at the start of the 2022 English cricket season, Potts played in a warm-up match for Derbyshire against Oxford University Cricket Club, as part of the Marylebone Cricket Club University Matches. Potts took two wickets in the match, including that of opener Joe Gordon.

Potts made his first-class debut on 14 April 2022, for Derbyshire against Sussex in Division Two of the 2022 County Championship. Electing to bat first, Derbyshire made 505/8 in their innings before declaring, with Potts scoring nine runs. In the next innings, Potts was the leading wicket-taker for Derbyshire, taking three wickets for 43 runs, including that of the Sussex captain Tom Haines. Sussex were bowled out for 174 runs and were forced to follow-on. However, in their second innings, Sussex batted out a draw, making 513 runs for the loss of just three wickets. Potts effected a run out, and again took the wicket of Sussex's captain, but not before Haines had made 243 runs.

References

External links
 

2002 births
Living people
English cricketers
Derbyshire cricketers
Sportspeople from Burton upon Trent